Dream is the third Japanese-language extended play by South Korean boy band Seventeen. It was released on November 9, 2022, through Hybe Labels Japan. It contains one original song, "Dream", the Japanese version of two songs originally released in Korean, "Rock with You" and "All My Love", and the "holiday" version of the English track "Darling". The EP has been marketed as the band's "first" Japanese-language EP despite Seventeen having recorded two previous Japanese EPs, We Make You and 24H, which were officially classified as "mini-album".

Composition 
With lyrics written by Woozi, Bumzu and Lee Beom-hun, the lead single, "Dream", hints at the group's dream to become stars.

Promotion 
Seventeen will tour Japan in November and December 2022. They will hold a two-day concert at the Kyocera Dome, at the Tokyo Dome, and at the Vantelin Dome.

Commercial performance 
The EP debuted at number one on the Daily Oricon Albums Chart, selling 388,300 copies in its first day. It topped the chart for three days straight, recording 61,065 and 18,312 copies sold in its second and third day. The EP debuted at number one on the Weekly Oricon Albums Chart, having sold 498,000 copies in its first week.

Critical reception 
Jashley Ann Cruz of GMA Network said that "Seventeen proves they're versatile artists who can dominate every sphere they step on". Cruz commented positively on the lead single "Dream"s "soft and sweet" choreography and its music video's "dreamy aura", saying the song is "perfect for the upcoming holidays".

Track listing

Charts

Weekly charts

Monthly charts

Year-end charts

Certifications

References 

2022 albums
Seventeen (South Korean band) albums
Hybe Corporation albums
Japanese-language albums